The Estádio Antônio Alonso, also known as Estádio Antarctica Paulista or Estádio da Rua da Mooca was an association football stadium in São Paulo, Brazil.

Owned by the Companhia Antarctica Paulista, was used from 1920 to 1943 in matches of the Campeonato Paulista. It is currently the parking lot of the Bavaria Brewery, part of the Ambev group. It was located a few blocks from the Estádio Conde Rodolfo Crespi, the CA Juventus home.

References

Football venues in São Paulo
Defunct football venues in Brazil